Convoy JW 58 was an Arctic convoy sent from Great Britain by the Western Allies to aid the Soviet Union during World War II. It sailed in March 1944, reaching the Soviet northern ports in early April. All ships arrived safely. JW 58 was attacked by German U-boat and aircraft but suffered no losses. Three U-boats were destroyed and six aircraft were shot down during these operations.

Ships
The convoy consisted of 47 merchant ships which departed from Loch Ewe on 27 March 1944. It also included the US cruiser , which was being transferred to the Soviet navy as part of an agreement over the disposal of the surrendered Italian fleet. The convoy was joined from Iceland by three more ships en route from North America. Close escort was provided by a force led by Lt.Cdr Lambton in the destroyer . The force comprised two other destroyers and three corvettes. The convoy was accompanied initially by local escort groups from Britain and Iceland, joined later by a local escort group from Murmansk. Distant cover was provide by ships of the Home Fleet which were engaged in Operation Tungsten, an air strike against the German battleship Tirpitz anchored in Alta fjord.

Ranged against this force were the U-boats of the German arctic flotilla, 16 boats forming the patrol lines  Blitz, Hammer and Thor. German surface forces and air forces were much diminished at this stage of the conflict; Tirpitz was still not operational after Operation Source when British X-Craft damaged the ship and the Luftwaffe was reduced to scouting and shadowing operations.

Action

JW 58 departed Loch Ewe on 27 March 1944, accompanied by its local escort, the minesweeper Rattlesnake and two others, with two corvettes; On 29 March it met the Iceland contingent with its escort, the frigate Fitzroy and two A/S minesweepers. These were relieved by the Close escort and Ocean escort forces, and returned to base. On 29 March, Starling encountered U-961 in the Norwegian Sea. The U-boat was not part of the Arctic flotilla patrol lines but on passage to North Atlantic; she was unfortunate enough to encounter the RN force, was depth-charged and destroyed by Starling and Magpie of the 2nd SG.

On 31 March JW 58 met first patrol line and for 48 hours the U-boat force mounted 18 attacks on the convoy. No ships were hit but three U-boats were destroyed. On 2 April,  destroyed U-360 with a hedgehog attack. On 3 April a Swordfish from Activity attacked U-288 and with help from a Martlet and Avenger team from Tracker, destroyed her. On 3 April also JW 58 was joined by the eastern local escort, four Soviet destroyers, and on 4 April arrived at Kola without further incident.

Conclusion
With the safe arrival of so many ships and the destruction of three U-boats, plus a fourth incidental kill and six shadowing aircraft, JW 58 was one of the most successful Arctic convoys run by the Allies during World War II. JW 58 was the last Arctic convoy for several months. The sequence was discontinued during summer 1944 as all naval forces were required for Operation Neptune, the cover for the Normandy landings. It re-commenced in August 1944 with Convoy JW 59. Decorations to those taking part in JW 58 were announced on 18 July 1944.

Notes

Citations

References

 Clay Blair : Hitler's U-Boat War Vol 2 (1998) 
 Paul Kemp : Convoy! Drama in Arctic Waters (1993) 
 Paul Kemp  : U-Boats Destroyed  ( 1997) .  
 Axel Neistle  : German U-Boat Losses during World War II  (1998). 
 Bob Ruegg, Arnold Hague : Convoys to Russia (1992) 
 Bernard Schofield : (1964) The Russian Convoys BT Batsford  OCLC 862623
  JW 58 at Convoyweb

JW 58
C